Daniel Casey (born 1 June 1972) is an English actor. He is best known for playing DS Gavin Troy, the original sidekick of DCI Tom Barnaby, for the first six seasons of the long-running television series Midsomer Murders.

Early life 

The son of journalist and television presenter Luke Casey, he grew up in Stockton-on-Tees and attended Grey College, Durham, graduating with a BA in English Literature before pursuing a career in acting.

Career 

Casey began his acting career on stage, in a touring production of Dead Fish.

Casey is known for portraying DS Gavin Troy in Midsomer Murders, and Anthony Cox in Our Friends in the North. He also played leading firefighter Tony Barnes in the 2004 ITV firefighting series Steel River Blues. He also guest starred in M.I. High.

In 2010, he appeared in an episode of Inspector George Gently, and in 2011, he appeared in Marchlands. In 2012, and again in 2014, he appeared in Casualty. In early 2016, he appeared in Coronation Street.

Casey held a regular role in BBC soap opera EastEnders, playing Tom Bailey. He first appeared on 1 June 2017, and was originally credited as 'Nosebleed Man'. However, later on his character's name was announced, and he is now credited as Tom Bailey.

On 24 May 2018, he made his first appearance as Terry in Emmerdale.

On 28 Jan 2022 Casey began appearing as Professor Plum in the touring stage production of Cluedo.

Personal life 

He has two sons, Rafferty and Milo, with his wife Ellie. They married in October 2005.

References

External links

1972 births
Living people
Alumni of Grey College, Durham
English male soap opera actors
English male television actors
Actors from County Durham
Actors from Stockton-on-Tees
20th-century English male actors